The 2014–15 Montenegrin Cup was the ninth season of the Montenegrin knockout football tournament. The winner of the tournament received a berth in the first qualifying round of the 2015–16 UEFA Europa League. The defending champions were Lovćen, who beat Mladost in the final of the last competition. The competition featured 30 teams. It started on 24 September 2014 and ended with the final on 20 May 2015.

First round
The 14 matches in this round will be played on 24 and 25 September 2014.

Summary

|}

Matches

Second round
The 14 winners from the First Round and last year's cup finalists, Lovćen and Mladost, compete in this round. Starting with this round, all rounds of the competition will be two-legged except for the final.  The first legs were held on 1 October 2014, while the second legs were held on 22 October 2014.

Summary

|}

First legs

Second legs

Quarter-finals
The eight winners from the Second Round competed in this round. The first legs took place on 5 November 2014 and the second legs took place on 26 November 2014.

Summary

|}

First legs

Second legs

Semi-finals
The four winners from the quarter-finals competed in this round. The first legs took place on 8 April 2014 and the second legs took place on 22 April 2015.

Summary

|}

First legs

Second legs

Final

References

External links
Montenegrin Cup 2014-2015 at Football Association of Montenegro's official site
Montenegrin Cup 2014-2015 at Soccerway

Montenegrin Cup seasons
Montenegrin Cup
Cup